Khuda Ki Basti is a serial produced by Pakistan Television first in 1969 and then again in 1974 based on the novel Khuda Ki Basti by Shaukat Siddiqui.

It broke records of popularity in Pakistan. One TV critic in a major English-language newspaper in Pakistan says, "This is one of the oldest and greatest dramas in the history of Pakistani television".

First production in 1969 
Initially, Khuda Ki Basti was produced in November 1969 by Pakistan Television 26 episodes of 25 minutes each, by producer Ishrat Ansari. Some episodes were produced by Rasheed Umar Thanvi at Karachi TV — that small and historic studio "A" which still stands galore at the center. There was an advisory committee of Pakistan Television comprising a panel of famous intellectuals: Faiz Ahmed Faiz, Jamiluddin Aali besides Shaukat Siddiqui to ensure the perfection of the adaptation of the novel into drama.

Second production in 1974 
In 1974, Prime Minister Zulfikar Ali Bhutto had directed re-telecast of Khuda Ki Basti as it was Bhutto's favorite serial with mass appeal and message. But the Pakistan Television had some problems as the video tape recordings of the drama on spool in 1969 had long been erased due to new videotape scarcity and the need to re-record some other new programs on those spools. Zulfikar Ali Bhutto insisted that the serial must be re-telecast even if fresh recording is essential.

The 1974 version of re-recorded Khuda Ki Basti was 50-minute episodes which lasted 13 weeks and created the same impact that the 1969 version did. It was Khuda Ki Basti and nothing else for the viewers. TV directors Bakhtiyar Ahmed and Qasim Jalali did a fine job. This time around, the entire serial has been well maintained by Pakistan Television with a repeat telecast in 1990 which termed the adaptation of Shaukat Siddiqui’s novel Khuda Ki Basti as "Mother of All Serials" at Pakistan Television Corporation.

Produced by GeoTv 
Geo has also released Khuda Ki Basti, which was produced by Rashid Sami (Kohinoor Studio). In this Sohail Asghar was cast in the role of Niaz.

Cast

 Zaheen Tahira as Maa (Mother)
 Qazi Wajid as Raja
 Mahmood Ali as Kaale Sahab
 Zahoor Ahmed as Niaz
 Subhani ba Yunus as Mistri Abdullah
 Arsh Muneer as Sultana's aunt
 Shakeel Chughtai as Shami
 Rizwan Wasti
 Zafar Masood as Nosha (1969 version)Behroze Sabzwari (1974 version)
 Tauqir Fatima as Sultana (1969 version)Munawwar Sultana (1974 version)
 Iqbal Tareen as Salman (1969 version)Saqib Sheikh (1974 version)

See also
 Khuda Ki Basti (Karachi) a neighborhood of Karachi, Sindh, Pakistan
 Khuda Ki Basti (novel) a novel by Shaukat Siddiqui

References

External links
 'Khuda Ki Basti' on YouTube

Pakistani drama television series
Urdu-language television shows
Pakistan Television Corporation original programming
Television shows set in Karachi
Television shows based on books